This is a list of Danish television related events from 1999.

Events
13 March - Michael Teschl and Trine Jepsen are selected to represent Denmark at the 1999 Eurovision Song Contest with their song "Denne gang". They are selected to be the twenty-eighth Danish Eurovision entry during Dansk Melodi Grand Prix held at the DR Studios in Copenhagen.

Debuts

Television shows

Ending this year

Births

Deaths

See also
1999 in Denmark